

Events

Pre-1600
12 BCE – The Roman emperor Augustus is named Pontifex Maximus, incorporating the position into that of the emperor.
 632 – The Farewell Sermon (Khutbah, Khutbatul Wada') of the Islamic prophet Muhammad.
 845 – The 42 Martyrs of Amorium are killed after refusing to convert to Islam.
 961 – Byzantine conquest of Chandax by Nikephoros Phokas, end of the Emirate of Crete.
1204 – The Siege of Château Gaillard ends in a French victory over King John of England, who loses control of Normandy to King Philip II Augustus.
1323 – Treaty of Paris of 1323 is signed.
1454 – Thirteen Years' War: Delegates of the Prussian Confederation pledge allegiance to King Casimir IV of Poland who agrees to commit his forces in aiding the Confederation's struggle for independence from the Teutonic Knights.
1521 – Ferdinand Magellan arrives at Guam.

1601–1900
1665 – The first joint Secretary of the Royal Society, Henry Oldenburg, publishes the first issue of Philosophical Transactions of the Royal Society, the world's longest-running scientific journal.
1788 – The First Fleet arrives at Norfolk Island in order to found a convict settlement.
1820 – The Missouri Compromise is signed into law by President James Monroe. The compromise allows Missouri to enter the Union as a slave state, brings Maine into the Union as a free state, and makes the rest of the northern part of the Louisiana Purchase territory slavery-free.
1834 – York, Upper Canada, is incorporated as Toronto.
1836 – Texas Revolution: Battle of the Alamo: After a thirteen-day siege by an army of 3,000 Mexican troops, the 187 Texas volunteers, including frontiersman Davy Crockett and colonel Jim Bowie, defending the Alamo are killed and the fort is captured.
1857 – The Supreme Court of the United States rules 7–2 in the Dred Scott v. Sandford case that the Constitution does not confer citizenship on black people.
1869 – Dmitri Mendeleev presents the first periodic table to the Russian Chemical Society.
1882 – The Serbian kingdom is re-founded.
1899 – Bayer registers "Aspirin" as a trademark.

1901–present
1901 – Anarchist assassin tries to kill German Emperor Wilhelm II. 
1904 – Scottish National Antarctic Expedition: Led by William Speirs Bruce, the Antarctic region of Coats Land was discovered from the Scotia.
1930 – International Unemployment Day demonstrations globally initiated by the Comintern. 
1933 – Great Depression: President Franklin D. Roosevelt declares a "bank holiday", closing all U.S. banks and freezing all financial transactions.
1943 – Norman Rockwell published Freedom from Want in The Saturday Evening Post with a matching essay by Carlos Bulosan as part of the Four Freedoms series.
  1943   – World War II: Generalfeldmarschall Erwin Rommel launches the Battle of Medenine in an attempt to slow down the British Eight Army. It fails, and he leaves Africa three days later.
  1943   – World War II: The Battle of Fardykambos, one of the first major battles between the Greek Resistance and the occupying Royal Italian Army, ends with the surrender of an entire Italian battalion, the bulk of the garrison of the town of Grevena, leading to its liberation a fortnight later.
1944 – World War II: Soviet Air Forces bomb an evacuated town of Narva in German-occupied Estonia, destroying the entire historical Swedish-era town.
1945 – World War II: Cologne is captured by American troops. On the same day, Operation Spring Awakening, the last major German offensive of the war, begins. 
1946 – Ho Chi Minh signs an agreement with France which recognizes Vietnam as an autonomous state in the Indochinese Federation and the French Union.
1951 – Cold War: The trial of Ethel and Julius Rosenberg begins.
1953 – Georgy Malenkov succeeds Joseph Stalin as Premier of the Soviet Union and First Secretary of the Communist Party of the Soviet Union.
1957 – Ghana becomes the first Sub-Saharan country to gain independence from the British.
1964 – Nation of Islam leader Elijah Muhammad officially gives boxing champion Cassius Clay the name Muhammad Ali.
  1964   – Constantine II becomes the last King of Greece.
1965 – Premier Tom Playford of South Australia loses power after 27 years in office.
1967 – Cold War: Joseph Stalin's daughter Svetlana Alliluyeva defects to the United States.
1968 – Three rebels are executed by Rhodesia, the first executions since UDI, prompting international condemnation.
1970 – An explosion at the Weather Underground safe house in Greenwich Village kills three.
1975 – For the first time the Zapruder film of the assassination of John F. Kennedy is shown in motion to a national TV audience by Robert J. Groden and Dick Gregory.
  1975   – Algiers Accord: Iran and Iraq announce a settlement of their border dispute.
1984 – In the United Kingdom, a walkout at Cortonwood Colliery in Brampton Bierlow signals the start of a strike that lasted almost a year and involved the majority of the country's miners.
1987 – The British ferry  capsizes in about 90 seconds, killing 193.
1988 – Three Provisional Irish Republican Army volunteers are shot dead by the SAS in Gibraltar in Operation Flavius.
1992 – The Michelangelo computer virus begins to affect computers.
2003 – Air Algérie Flight 6289 crashes at the Aguenar – Hadj Bey Akhamok Airport in Tamanrasset, Algeria, killing 102 out of the 103 people on board.
2008 – A suicide bomber kills 68 people (including first responders) in Baghdad on the same day that a gunman kills eight students in Jerusalem.
2018 – Forbes names Jeff Bezos as the world's richest person, for the first time, at $112 billion net worth.
2020 – Thirty-two people are killed and 81 are injured when gunmen open fire on a ceremony in Kabul, Afghanistan. The Islamic State claims responsibility for the attack.

Births

Pre-1600
1340 – John of Gaunt (probable; d. 1399)
1405 – John II of Castile (d. 1454)
1459 – Jakob Fugger, German merchant and banker (d. 1525)
1475 – Michelangelo, Italian painter and sculptor (d. 1564)
1483 – Francesco Guicciardini, Italian historian and politician (d. 1540)
1493 – Juan Luis Vives, Spanish scholar and humanist (d. 1540)
1495 – Luigi Alamanni, Italian poet and diplomat (d. 1556)
1536 – Santi di Tito, Italian painter (d. 1603)

1601–1900
1619 – Cyrano de Bergerac, French author and playwright (d. 1655)
1663 – Francis Atterbury, English bishop and poet (d. 1732)
1706 – George Pocock, English admiral (d. 1792)
1716 – Pehr Kalm, Swedish-Finnish botanist and explorer (d. 1779)
1724 – Henry Laurens, English-American merchant and politician, 5th President of the Continental Congress (d. 1792)
1761 – Antoine-François Andréossy, French general and diplomat (d. 1828)
1779 – Antoine-Henri Jomini, Swiss-French general (d. 1869)
1780 – Lucy Barnes, American writer (d. 1809)
1785 – Karol Kurpiński, Polish composer and conductor (d. 1857)
1787 – Joseph von Fraunhofer, German physicist and astronomer (d. 1826)
1806 – Elizabeth Barrett Browning, English-Italian poet and translator (d. 1861)
1812 – Aaron Lufkin Dennison, American businessman, co-founded the Waltham Watch Company (d. 1895)
1817 – Princess Clémentine of Orléans (d. 1907)
1818 – William Claflin, American businessman and politician, 27th Governor of Massachusetts (d. 1905)
1823 – Charles I of Württemberg (d. 1891)
1826 – Annie Feray Mutrie, British painter (d. 1893)
1831 – Philip Sheridan, Irish-American general (d. 1888)
1834 – George du Maurier, French-English author and illustrator (d. 1896)
1841 – Viktor Burenin, Russian author, poet, playwright, and critic (d. 1926)
1849 – Georg Luger, Austrian gun designer, designed the Luger pistol (d. 1923)
1864 – Richard Rushall, British businessman (d. 1953)
1865 – Duan Qirui, Chinese warlord and politician (d. 1936)
1870 – Oscar Straus, Viennese composer and conductor (d. 1954)
1871 – Afonso Costa, Portuguese lawyer and politician, 59th Prime Minister of Portugal (d. 1937)
1872 – Ben Harney, American pianist and composer (d. 1938)
1877 – Rose Fyleman, English writer and poet (d. 1957)
1879 – Jimmy Hunter, New Zealand rugby player (d. 1962)
1882 – F. Burrall Hoffman, American architect, co-designed Villa Vizcaya (d. 1980)
  1882   – Guy Kibbee, American actor and singer (d. 1956)
1884 – Molla Mallory, Norwegian-American tennis player (d. 1959)
1885 – Ring Lardner, American journalist and author (d. 1933)
1892 – Bert Smith, English international footballer (d. 1969)
1893 – Furry Lewis, American singer-songwriter and guitarist (d. 1981)
  1893   – Ella P. Stewart, pioneering Black American pharmacist (d. 1987)
1895 – Albert Tessier, Canadian priest and historian (d. 1976)
1898 – Gus Sonnenberg, American football player and wrestler (d. 1944)
1900 – Gina Cigna, French-Italian soprano and actress (d. 2001)
  1900   – Lefty Grove, American baseball player (d. 1975)
  1900   – Henri Jeanson, French journalist and author (d. 1970)

1901–present
1903 – Empress Kōjun of Japan (d. 2000)
1904 – José Antonio Aguirre, Spanish lawyer and politician, 1st President of the Basque Country (d. 1960)
1905 – Bob Wills, American Western swing musician, songwriter, and bandleader (d. 1975) 
1906 – Lou Costello, American actor and comedian (d. 1959)
1909 – Obafemi Awolowo, Nigerian lawyer and politician (d. 1987)
  1909   – Stanisław Jerzy Lec, Polish poet and author (d. 1966)
1910 – Emma Bailey, American auctioneer and author (d. 1999)
1912 – Mohammed Burhanuddin, Indian spiritual leader, 52nd Da'i al-Mutlaq (d. 2014)
1913 – Ella Logan, Scottish-American singer and actress (d. 1969)
1917 – Donald Davidson, American philosopher and academic (d. 2003)
  1917   – Will Eisner, American illustrator and publisher (d. 2005)
  1917   – Frankie Howerd, English comedian (d. 1992)
1918 – Howard McGhee, American trumpeter (d. 1987)
1920 – Lewis Gilbert, English director, producer, and screenwriter (d. 2018)
1921 – Leo Bretholz, Austrian-American holocaust survivor and author (d. 2014)
1923 – Ed McMahon, American comedian, game show host, and announcer (d. 2009)
  1923   – Wes Montgomery, American guitarist and songwriter (d. 1968)
1924 – Ottmar Walter, German footballer (d. 2013)
  1924   – William H. Webster, American lawyer and jurist, 14th Director of Central Intelligence
1926 – Ann Curtis, American swimmer (d. 2012)
  1926   – Alan Greenspan, American economist and politician
  1926   – Ray O'Connor, Australian politician, 22nd Premier of Western Australia (d. 2013)
  1926   – Andrzej Wajda, Polish director, producer, and screenwriter (d. 2016)
1927 – William J. Bell, American screenwriter and producer (d. 2005)
  1927   – Gordon Cooper, American engineer, pilot, and astronaut (d. 2004)
  1927   – Gabriel García Márquez, Colombian journalist and author, Nobel Prize laureate (d. 2014)
1929 – Tom Foley, American lawyer and politician, 57th Speaker of the United States House of Representatives (d. 2013)
  1929   – David Sheppard, English cricketer and bishop (d. 2005)
1930 – Lorin Maazel, French-American violinist, composer, and conductor (d. 2014)
1932 – Marc Bazin, Haitian lawyer and politician, 49th President of Haiti (d. 2010)
  1932   – Bronisław Geremek, Polish historian and politician, Polish Minister of Foreign Affairs (d. 2008)
1933 – Ted Abernathy, American baseball player (d. 2004)
  1933   – William Davis, German-English journalist and economist (d. 2019)
  1933   – Augusto Odone, Italian economist and inventor of Lorenzo's oil (d. 2013)
1934 – Red Simpson, American singer-songwriter (d. 2016)
1935 – Ron Delany, Irish runner and coach
  1935   – Derek Kevan, English footballer (d. 2013)
1936 – Bob Akin, American race car driver and journalist (d. 2002)
  1936   – Marion Barry, American lawyer and politician, 2nd Mayor of the District of Columbia (d. 2014)
  1936   – Choummaly Sayasone, Laotian politician, 5th President of Laos
1937 – Ivan Boesky, American businessman
  1937   – Valentina Tereshkova, Russian general, pilot, and astronaut
1938 – Keishu Tanaka, Japanese politician, 17th Japanese Minister of Justice
1939 – Kit Bond, American lawyer and politician, 47th Governor of Missouri
  1939   – Adam Osborne, Thai-Indian engineer and businessman, founded the Osborne Computer Corporation (d. 2003)
1940 – Ken Danby, Canadian painter (d. 2007)
  1940   – Joanna Miles, French-born American actress
  1940   – R. H. Sikes, American golfer
  1940   – Willie Stargell, American baseball player and coach (d. 2001)
  1940   – Jeff Wooller, English accountant and banker
1941 – Peter Brötzmann, German saxophonist and clarinet player 
  1941   – Marilyn Strathern, Welsh anthropologist and academic
1942 – Ben Murphy, American actor
1944 – Richard Corliss, American journalist and critic (d. 2015)
  1944   – Kiri Te Kanawa, New Zealand soprano and actress
  1944   – Mary Wilson, American singer (d. 2021) 
1945 – Angelo Castro Jr., Filipino actor and journalist (d. 2012)
1946 – Patrick Baudry, French military officer and astronaut
  1946   – David Gilmour, English singer-songwriter and guitarist 
  1946   – Richard Noble, Scottish race car driver and businessman
1947 – Kiki Dee, English singer-songwriter
  1947   – Dick Fosbury, American high jumper (d. 2023)
  1947   – Anna Maria Horsford, American actress
  1947   – Rob Reiner, American actor, director, producer, and activist
  1947   – Jean Seaton, English historian and academic
  1947   – John Stossel, American journalist and author
1948 – Stephen Schwartz, American composer and producer
1949 – Shaukat Aziz, Pakistani economist and politician, 15th Prime Minister of Pakistan
  1949   – Martin Buchan, Scottish footballer and manager
1950 – Arthur Roche, English archbishop
1951 – Gerrie Knetemann, Dutch cyclist (d. 2004)
1952 – Denis Napthine, Australian politician, 47th Premier of Victoria
1953 – Madhav Kumar Nepal, Nepali banker and politician, 34th Prime Minister of Nepal
  1953   – Carolyn Porco, American astronomer and academic
  1953   – Phil Alvin, American singer-songwriter and guitarist
1954 – Jeff Greenwald, American author, photographer, and monologist
  1954   – Harald Schumacher, German footballer and manager
1955 – Cyprien Ntaryamira, Burundian politician, 5th President of Burundi (d. 1994)
  1955   – Alberta Watson, Canadian actress (d. 2015)
1956 – Peter Roebuck, English cricketer, journalist, and sportcaster (d. 2011)
  1956   – Steve Vizard, Australian television host, actor, and producer
1960 – Sleepy Floyd, American basketball player and coach
1962 – Alison Nicholas, British golfer
1963 – D. L. Hughley, American actor, producer, and screenwriter
1964 – Linda Pearson, Scottish sport shooter
1965 – Allan Bateman, Welsh rugby player
  1965   – Jim Knight, English politician
1966 – Alan Davies, English comedian, actor and screenwriter
1967 – Julio Bocca, Argentinian ballet dancer and director
  1967   – Connie Britton, American actress
  1967   – Glenn Greenwald, American journalist and author 
  1967   – Shuler Hensley, American actor and singer
1968 – Moira Kelly, American actress and director
1971 – Darrick Martin, American basketball player and coach
1972 – Shaquille O'Neal, American basketball player, actor, and rapper
  1972   – Jaret Reddick, American singer-songwriter, guitarist, and actor 
1973 – Michael Finley, American basketball player
  1973   – Peter Lindgren, Swedish guitarist and songwriter 
  1973   – Greg Ostertag, American basketball player
  1973   – Trent Willmon, American singer-songwriter and guitarist
1974 – Guy Garvey, English singer-songwriter and guitarist 
  1974   – Matthew Guy, Australian politician 
  1974   – Brad Schumacher, American swimmer
  1974   – Beanie Sigel, American rapper 
1975 – Aracely Arámbula, Mexican actress and singer
  1975   – Yannick Nézet-Séguin, Canadian pianist and conductor
1976 – Ken Anderson, American wrestler and actor
1977 – Nantie Hayward, South African cricketer
  1977   – Giorgos Karagounis, Greek international footballer
  1977   – Shabani Nonda, DR Congolese footballer
  1977   – Marcus Thames, American baseball player and coach
1978 – Sage Rosenfels, American football player
  1978   – Chad Wicks, American wrestler
1979 – Clint Barmes, American baseball player
  1979   – Érik Bédard, Canadian baseball player
  1979   – David Flair, American wrestler
  1979   – Tim Howard, American soccer player
1980 – Emílson Cribari, Brazilian footballer
1981 – Ellen Muth, American actress
1983 – Andranik Teymourian, Armenian-Iranian footballer
1984 – Daniël de Ridder, Dutch footballer
  1984   – Eskil Pedersen, Norwegian politician
  1984   – Chris Tomson, American drummer 
1985 – Bakaye Traoré, French-Malian footballer
1986 – Jake Arrieta, American baseball player
  1986   – Francisco Cervelli, Venezuelan-Italian baseball player
  1986   – Ross Detwiler, American baseball player
  1986   – Eli Marienthal, American actor
  1986   – Charlie Mulgrew, Scottish footballer
1987 – Kevin-Prince Boateng, Ghanaian-German footballer
  1987   – Chico Flores, Spanish footballer
1988 – Agnes, Swedish singer 
  1988   – Marina Erakovic, New Zealand tennis player 
  1988   – Simon Mignolet, Belgian footballer
1989 – Agnieszka Radwańska, Polish tennis player
1990 – Derek Drouin, Canadian athlete
1991 – Lex Luger, American keyboard player and producer 
  1991   – Emma McDougall, English footballer (d. 2013)
  1991   – Tyler Gregory Okonma, American rapper
1992 – Sam Bankman-Fried, American businessman
1993 – Andrés Rentería, Colombian footballer
1994 – Marcus Smart, American basketball player
1995 – Georgi Kitanov, Bulgarian footballer
1996 – Christian Coleman, American sprinter
  1996   – Tyrell Fuimaono, Australian rugby player
  1996   – Timo Werner, German footballer
1999 – Ylena In-Albon, Swiss tennis player

Deaths

Pre-1600
 190 – Liu Bian (poisoned by Dong Zhuo) (b. 176)
 653 – Li Ke, prince of the Tang Dynasty (b. 619)
 766 – Chrodegang, Frankish bishop and saint
 903 – Lu Guangqi, Chinese official and chancellor
   903   – Su Jian, Chinese official and chancellor
1070 – Ulric I, Margrave of Carniola
1251 – Rose of Viterbo, Italian saint (b. 1235)
1353 – Roger Grey, 1st Baron Grey de Ruthyn
1447 – Colette of Corbie, French abbess and saint in the Catholic Church (b. 1381)
1466 – Alvise Loredan, Venetian admiral and statesman (b. 1393)
1490 – Ivan the Young, Ruler of Tver (b. 1458)
1491 – Richard Woodville, 3rd Earl Rivers
1531 – Pedro Arias Dávila, Spanish explorer and diplomat (b. 1440)

1601–1900
1616 – Francis Beaumont, English playwright (b. 1584)
1754 – Henry Pelham, English politician, Prime Minister of the United Kingdom (b. 1694)
1758 – Henry Vane, 1st Earl of Darlington, English politician, Lord Lieutenant of Durham (b. 1705)
1764 – Philip Yorke, 1st Earl of Hardwicke, English lawyer and politician, Lord Chancellor of the United Kingdom (b. 1690)
1796 – Guillaume Thomas François Raynal, French historian and author (b. 1713)
1836 – Deaths at the Battle of the Alamo:
                James Bonham, American lawyer and soldier (b. 1807)
                James Bowie, American colonel (b. 1796)
                Davy Crockett, American soldier and politician (b. 1786)
                William B. Travis, American lieutenant colonel and lawyer (b. 1809)
1854 – Charles Vane, 3rd Marquess of Londonderry, Irish colonel and diplomat, Under-Secretary of State for War and the Colonies (b. 1778)
1866 – William Whewell, English priest, historian, and philosopher (b. 1794)
1867 – Charles Farrar Browne, American-English author and educator (b. 1834)
1888 – Louisa May Alcott, American novelist and poet  (b. 1832)
1895 – Camilla Collett, Norwegian novelist and activist (b. 1813)
1899 – Kaʻiulani of Hawaii (b. 1875)
1900 – Gottlieb Daimler, German engineer and businessman, co-founded Daimler-Motoren-Gesellschaft (b. 1834)

1901–present
1905 – John Henninger Reagan, American surveyor, judge, and politician, 3rd Confederate States of America Secretary of the Treasury (b. 1818)
  1905   – Makar Yekmalyan, Armenian composer (b. 1856)
1919 – Oskars Kalpaks, Latvian colonel (b. 1882)
1920 – Ömer Seyfettin, Turkish author and educator (b. 1884)
1932 – John Philip Sousa, American conductor and composer (b. 1854)
1933 – Anton Cermak, Czech-American lawyer and politician, 44th Mayor of Chicago (b. 1873)
1935 – Oliver Wendell Holmes Jr., American colonel, lawyer, and jurist (b. 1841)
1939 – Ferdinand von Lindemann, German mathematician and academic (b. 1852)
1941 – Francis Aveling, Canadian priest, psychologist, and author (b. 1875)
  1941   – Gutzon Borglum, American sculptor and academic, designed Mount Rushmore (b. 1867)
1948 – Ross Lockridge Jr., American author, poet, and academic (b. 1914)
  1948   – Alice Woodby McKane, First Black woman doctor in Savannah, Georgia (b. 1865)
1950 – Albert François Lebrun, French engineer and politician, 15th President of France (b. 1871)
1951 – Ivor Novello, Welsh singer-songwriter and actor (b. 1893)
  1951   – Volodymyr Vynnychenko, Ukrainian playwright and politician, Prime Minister of Ukraine (b. 1880)
1952 – Jürgen Stroop, German general (b. 1895)
1955 – Mammad Amin Rasulzade, Azerbaijani scholar and politician (b. 1884)
1961 – George Formby, English singer-songwriter and actor (b. 1904)
1964 – Paul of Greece (b. 1901)
1965 – Margaret Dumont, American actress (b. 1889)
1967 – John Haden Badley, English author and educator, founded the Bedales School (b. 1865)
  1967   – Nelson Eddy, American actor and singer (b. 1901)
  1967   – Zoltán Kodály, Hungarian composer, linguist, and philosopher (b. 1882)
1970 – William Hopper, American actor (b. 1915)
1973 – Pearl S. Buck, American novelist, essayist, short story writer, Nobel Prize laureate (b. 1892)
1974 – Ernest Becker, American anthropologist and author (b. 1924)
1976 – Maxie Rosenbloom, American boxer (b. 1903)
1977 – Alvin R. Dyer, American religious leader (b. 1903)
1978 – Dennis Viollet, English-American soccer player and manager (b. 1933)
1981 – George Geary, English cricketer and coach (b. 1893)
  1981   – Rambhau Mhalgi, Indian politician and member of the Lok Sabha (b. 1921)
1982 – Ayn Rand, Russian-American philosopher, author, and playwright (b. 1905)
1984 – Billy Collins Jr., American boxer (b. 1961)
  1984   – Martin Niemöller, German pastor and theologian (b. 1892)
  1984   – Homer N. Wallin, American admiral (b. 1893)
  1984   – Henry Wilcoxon, Dominican-American actor and producer (b. 1905)
1986 – Georgia O'Keeffe, American painter (b. 1887)
1988 – Mairéad Farrell, Provisional IRA volunteer (b. 1957)
  1988   – Daniel McCann, Provisional IRA volunteer (b. 1957)
  1988   – Seán Savage, Provisional IRA volunteer (b. 1965)
1994 – Melina Mercouri, Greek actress and politician, 9th Greek Minister of Culture (b. 1920)
1997 – Cheddi Jagan, Guyanese politician, 4th President of Guyana (b. 1918)
  1997   – Michael Manley, Jamaican soldier, pilot, and politician, 4th Prime Minister of Jamaica (b. 1924)
  1997   – Ursula Torday, English author (b. 1912)
1999 – Isa bin Salman Al Khalifa, Bahrain king (b. 1933)
2000 – John Colicos, Canadian actor (b. 1928)
2002 – Bryan Fogarty, Canadian ice hockey player (b. 1969)
2004 – Hercules, American wrestler (b. 1957)
  2004   – Frances Dee, American actress (b. 1909)
2005 – Hans Bethe, German-American physicist and academic, Nobel Prize laureate (b. 1906)
  2005   – Danny Gardella, American baseball player and trainer (b. 1920)
  2005   – Tommy Vance, English radio host (b. 1943)
  2005   – Teresa Wright, American actress (b. 1918)
  2005   – Gladys Marín, Chilean activist and political figure (b.1938)
2006 – Anne Braden, American journalist and activist (b. 1924)
  2006   – Kirby Puckett, American baseball player and sportscaster (b. 1960)
2007 – Jean Baudrillard, French photographer and theorist (b. 1929)
  2007   – Ernest Gallo, American businessman, co-founded E & J Gallo Winery (b. 1909)
2008 – Peter Poreku Dery, Ghanaian cardinal (b. 1918)
2009 – Francis Magalona, Filipino rapper, producer, and actor (b. 1964)
2010 – Endurance Idahor, Nigerian footballer (b. 1984)
  2010   – Mark Linkous, American singer-songwriter, guitarist, and producer (b. 1962)
  2010   – Betty Millard, American philanthropist and activist (b. 1911)
2012 – Francisco Xavier do Amaral, East Timorese politician, 1st President of East Timor (b. 1937)
  2012   – Donald M. Payne, American businessman and politician (b. 1934)
  2012   – Helen Walulik, American baseball player (b. 1929)
2013 – Chorão, Brazilian singer-songwriter (b. 1970)
  2013   – Stompin' Tom Connors, Canadian singer-songwriter and guitarist (b. 1936)
  2013   – Alvin Lee, English singer-songwriter and guitarist  (b. 1944)
  2013   – W. Wallace Cleland, American biochemist and academic (b. 1930)
2014 – Alemayehu Atomsa, Ethiopian educator and politician (b. 1969)
  2014   – Frank Jobe, American soldier and surgeon (b. 1925)
  2014   – Sheila MacRae, English-American actress, singer, and dancer (b. 1921)
  2014   – Martin Nesbitt, American lawyer and politician (b. 1946)
  2014   – Manlio Sgalambro, Italian philosopher, author, and poet (b. 1924)
2015 – Fred Craddock, American minister and academic (b. 1928)
  2015   – Ram Sundar Das, Indian lawyer and politician, 18th Chief Minister of Bihar (b. 1921)
  2015   – Enrique "Coco" Vicéns, Puerto Rican-American basketball player and politician (b. 1926)
2016 – Nancy Reagan, American actress, 42nd First Lady of the United States (b. 1921)
  2016   – Sheila Varian, American horse trainer and breeder (b. 1937)
2017 – Robert Osborne, American actor and historian (b. 1932)
2018 – Peter Nicholls, Australian science fiction critic and encyclopedist (b. 1939)
2021 – Lou Ottens, Dutch engineer and inventor (b.1926)
  2021   – Graham Pink, British nurse (b. 1929)

Holidays and observances
Christian feast day:
Chrodegang
Colette of Corbie
Fridolin of Säckingen
Kyneburga, Kyneswide and Tibba
Marcian of Tortona
March 6 (Eastern Orthodox liturgics)
European Day of the Righteous, commemorates those who have stood up against crimes against humanity and totalitarianism with their own moral responsibility. (Europe)
Foundation Day (Norfolk Island), the founding of Norfolk Island in 1788.
Independence Day (Ghana), celebrates the independence of Ghana from the UK in 1957.

References

External links

 BBC: On This Day
 
 Historical Events on March 6

Days of the year
March